Sindhu Tolani is an Indian actress working in Telugu, Tamil, Kannada and Hindi language films. Tolani was born in Mumbai, India on 19 July 1983. She has been a Fair & Lovely cream model in North India.

Film career
Sindhu Tolani started her career with the Telugu movie Aithe directed by the famous Chandra Sekhar Yeleti. Her first popular film in Telugu was Athanokkade with Kalyan Ram. She has also appeared in Manmadhan with Silambarasan in addition to many Telugu and Kannada films. She also acted in the Television series Kutumb, which aired on Sony TV.

She was also a part of Mani Ratnam's stage show, Netru, Indru, Naalai.

Filmography

See also
 List of Indian film actresses

External links
 
 

Actresses in Tamil cinema
Actresses in Telugu cinema
Actresses in Kannada cinema
Living people
Actresses from Mumbai
Actresses in Hindi cinema
Indian film actresses
21st-century Indian actresses
1983 births
Actresses from Bangalore
Female models from Bangalore